Kończyce  is a village in the administrative district of Gmina Domaniów, within Oława County, Lower Silesian Voivodeship, in southwestern Poland.

References

Villages in Oława County